Environmental social science is the broad, transdisciplinary study of interrelations between humans and the natural environment. Environmental social scientists work within and between the fields of anthropology, communication studies, economics, geography, history, political science, psychology, and sociology; and also in the interdisciplinary fields of environmental studies, human ecology and political ecology, social epidemiology, among others.

Ideologies, fields and concepts 

Ideologies, fields and concepts in environmental social science aim to convey environmental issues as intertwined in societal relations, institutions and human activities that continually shape the environment or are themselves shaped by the environment. For example, political ecology is based on the premise that the environment is not "A-political" therefore the way it is managed, who has access to the environment, how environmental resources are distributed are shaped through political structures, power relations, economic institutions and social processes. Paul Robbins, conveys this in his differentiation of "A-political verse political ecologies". According to Robbins political ecology places emphasis on identifying "broader systems rather than blaming proximate and local forces; between viewing ecological systems as power-laden rather than politically inert; and between taking an explicitly normative approach rather than one that claims the objectivity of disinterest". Human environmental relations reverberate through "the system"  (politics, economics, power relations) moving through an entire web of human relations and structures that are intertwined in ecological relations.

Therefore, environmental social scientists stress human – environmental relationships. Another idea that has risen to prominence in environmental social science in light of this, is the idea of "environmental justice" which connects issues in the field of social justice with issues related to the environment. In describing environmental justice, the concepts emphasized by Shoreman-Ouimet and Kopnina include "equity equality, and rights issues in relation to both social and ecological actors". This pans out in debates about environmental vulnerability and the unequal distribution of resources. Here lies the idea, that certain groups are made more vulnerable to "environmental burdens" while others gain more access to "environmental benefits" as defined in terms of environmental resources and services.

In further attempting to understand human - environmental relationships disciplines of environmental social science have begun to explore relationships between humans and non-humans, to understand how both interact with each other within the natural world. Interactions that force to reconceptualize identity as ecocultural. Ideas related to exploring human and animal interactions within the natural world, have become prominent in environmental ethics. Shoreman Ouimet and Kopnina define environment ethics as "a sub-discipline of philosophy that deals with the ethical problems surrounding the environment, in some cases providing ethical justification and moral motivation for the cause of environmental protection or for considerations of animal welfare". This has culminated in debates regarding environmental value and moral rights and who within the larger ecosystem should be assigned these rights. Environmental ethics explores the dialectic between human and nature exploring how the human configuration of nature may in turn reshape humans, their relationships and their conditions. Ideas that have emerged from the questions seeking to examine this dialectic include those of "post-domesticity and domesticity". Domesticity refers to societal dynamics produced in societies in which humans have daily contact with animals other than pets in contrast in post-domesticity people are quite distant from the animals they consume in referencing the ideas of Bulliet (2005) Emel and Neo convey that a distance from witnessing the processes that govern animal life including births, deaths while consuming animals as food, impacts people differently than if they were to be interacting continuously with animals. They mention that post- domesticity may produce feelings of guilt however the continued distance between animal life brought by interacting with animals as a commodity may cause people to only distantly relate to them or think of them as packages in a store disassociating them from the life-cycles they embody. Therefore, environmental science has paved the way to multiple concepts, ideas and paradigms that differ among each other but all seek to intertwine issues related to the environment with other fields and issues in the social sciences.

Social epidemiology 
Social epidemiologists research how SES (socio-economic status) determines varying access to resources like income and prestige can generate stratification in health and quality of life. Often, their investigations relate to the social determinants of health which the Centers for Disease Control and Prevention (CDC) reports as the "conditions in the places where people live, learn, work, and play ... that affect a wide range of health risks and outcomes". These epidemiologists must work in conjunction with environmental social scientists to understand the significance of different environments' effects on humans. Such work influences environmental and public health policies to better the living standards for humans globally. The Fifth European Ministerial Conference on Environment and Health agreed to work on improving low-income housing conditions with new urban planning, health equity, and environmental justice policies with a specific focus on preventing children from exposure to significant environmental health risks. Certain environments' affects on humans provides trends that social epidemiologists can investigate to determine if they are related to a divide of social status especially if only a certain part of the population is negatively affected. Epidemiology uses a host-agent-environment triangle framework to understand why humans are falling ill and this three prong approach allows social epidemiologists to explore how the environment is contributing to the decline in health status for a subsection of or the entire population. It promotes the idea that the social, cultural, economic, political and environmental factors are all important factors to be considered, and health impact assessments (HIA) recommended by social epidemiologists working with environment social scientists are effectively making positive changes in the environment. The World Health Organization (WHO) worked with its members to compose the Strategic Environmental Assessment (SEA) protocol in 2001 to ensure health impact assessments would be made with environmental assessments for policies relating to bettering the quality of life especially within low socioeconomic communities all around the world. As the environment can create stressors that are factors (i.e. low quality housing in areas of high pollution) that limit the quality of life of millions of people globally, environmental social scientists work collaboratively with the data social epidemiologists investigate and provide to understand the relationship between health status and environmental issues.

See also
 Climate justice
 Coupled human–environment system
 Human impact on the environment
 List of environmental social science journals
 List of environmental studies topics
 Social science
 Women and the environment

References

Notes

Further reading 
 Berkhout, Frans, Melissa Leach, and Ian Scoones. 2003. "Shifting perspectives in environmental social science." pp. 1–31 in Negotiating Environmental Change: New Perspectives from Social Science. Cheltenham, UK: Edward Elgar. 
 Folmer, Henk, and Olof Johansson-Stenman. 2011. "Does Environmental Economics Produce Aeroplanes Without Engines? On the Need for an Environmental Social Science," Environmental and Resource Economics 48 (3): 337-361.
 Moran, Emilio. 2010. Environmental Social Science: Human-Environment Interactions and Sustainability. Malden, MA: John Wiley. 
 Scoones, I. 1999. "New Ecology and the Social Sciences: What Prospects for a Fruitful Engagement?" Annual Review of Anthropology 28: 479-507.
 Vaccaro, Ismael, Eric Alden Smith, and Shankar Aswani, eds. 2010. Environmental Social Sciences: Methods and Research Design. Cambridge, UK, and New York: Cambridge University Press.

External links
 Environment and Society: Scholarly Journals

 
Transdisciplinarity